Vandita Shrivastava is an Indian actress and model. She started her acting career in 2011 with Short Films, Television, Commercial Advertisements and Ramp Modelling. She switched to acting in Hindi Films in 2012 and worked in 9 Hindi Films. Her last release was Khajoor Pe Atke , in May 2018 and her upcoming film is Nanhe Einsteins( under Post Production). She is currently shooting for her first Webseries where she plays the Female Protagonist (TBA).

Education
Vandita did her Masters in Business Administration (MBA). She also has a Law Degree (LLB). She is a certified Web Designer.

Early life
Vandita moved to several cities due to her father's postings (Army). She always actively participated in sports and art during her schooling and college days. During school, she took training for a few years in Karate and Kathak Dance. She earned a yellow belt in Karate after which she quit.

Her father is a Colonel in the Indian Army. He is from the elite Parachute Regiment. Her mother is an educationist.

Career
Before venturing into showbiz, Vandita was a seasoned corporate professional in Human Resources and worked with some multinational companies.

Filmography

WebSeries

Television

References

External links
 
 

Female models from Mumbai
Living people
Actresses from Mumbai
Actresses in Hindi television
Indian television actresses
Actresses in Hindi cinema
Indian film actresses
21st-century Indian actresses
Year of birth missing (living people)